The third season of the Malaysian reality talent show Project SuperStar Malaysia, based on the Singaporean reality show of the same name began on 2 February 2008 on 8TV. For the third consecutive season, Gary Yap and Cheryl Lee returned as hosts.

The show premiered on 9 February 2008, with the live finals aired on 3 May 2008 at Malawati Stadium. Kay Guo, the winner of the female category, was announced as the overall winner of the season, with male category winner Chee Shi Hau as the overall runner-up. Guo was also the first female winner of Project Superstar Malaysia, as well as the first female winner in the entire Project Superstar franchise; she received a cash prize of RM$10,000 and a Recording Contract from EMI, while Chee was awarded a cash prize of RM$2,000.

Development
Over 4,000 aspirants auditioned for the competition when it was announced. Auditions took place in late 2007 and the final selection of the top 24 were revealed to the public for the first time on 16 February 2008. Their finalists were showcased in one episode on 17 February 2008.

On the live shows up until the grand finals, the voting percentages were modified, with both the judges' scores and public votes take up 50% of the scores each, instead of 70%-30% as opposed to the previous seasons.

Finalists
Key:
Key:
 – Winner
 – Runner-up
 – Gender/Category runner-up
 – Semi-finalist
 – Category 6th-8th place (lost revival)

* Eddie and Nicole Lai were initially eliminated in the second quarter-finals but were reinstated in week 5's revival round.

Live show details

Week 1: Quarter Finals 1 (23/24 February)
Theme: Personal Song (no theme), Contestant's duet

Week 2: Quarter Finals 2 (1/2 March)
Theme: Personal Song (no theme), Contestant's duet

Week 3: Quarter Finals 3 (8/9 March)
Theme: Personal Song (no theme), Contestant's duet

Week 4: Quarter Finals 4 (15/16 March)
Theme: Personal Song (no theme), Contestant's duet

Week 5: Revival Round (22/23 March)
Theme: No theme, Contestant's Duet
The eight contestants who were eliminated from the third and fourth quarter-finals returned to the stage to perform for the revival round. The contestant who received the highest combined score from either the male and female categories would be reinstated from the competition.

Week 6: Semi Finals 1 (29/30 March)
Theme: Dance songs
Group Performance: "当我们宅一块"

Week 7: Semi Finals 2 (5/6 April)
Theme: Best techniques
Group Performance: "离开地球表面"

Week 8: Semi Finals 3 (12/13 April)
Theme: Guandong Translated Songs, Japanese/Korean Translated Songs
Group Performance: "苦茶"

Week 9: Category final (19/20 April)
Theme: Judges' Choice, Malaysian Song, Winner's Single
Group Performance: "我就是喜欢你"

Week 10: Finals Prelude (26/27 April)
All top 24 finalists returned to the stage in this pre-recorded non-elimination performance show. It featured group performances from the finalists as well as a look-back on their journey in the competition.

Week 11: Final (3 May)
Theme: Fast-paced Songs, Charming Songs, Michael Wong's duet, Contestants' duet, Judges' choice, Winner's song
Group performances: "梦不落" (all finalists), "Will Be Superstar" (Chee Shi Hau & Kay Guo), "" (Female finalists eliminated in the first quarter-finals), "超喜欢你" (Male finalists eliminated in the first quarter-finals), "我恋爱了" (Female finalists eliminated in the second quarter-finals), "阳光宅男" (Male finalists eliminated in the second quarter-finals), "桃花源" (Female finalists eliminated in the semi-finals), "在这里等你" (Male finalists eliminated in the semi-finals), "我的天空我的梦" (all finalists) 
Musical guest: Desiree Tan & Orange Tan ("特务J"/"Way Back into Love"), Johnson Wee & Henley Hii ("傀儡"/"一眼瞬间"), Michael Wong ("烟火")

See also
 MediaCorp
 8TV
 Project SuperStar

External links
Official Website

2008 Malaysian television seasons